is a Japanese garden in Nara, Japan, to the immediate southwest of Isui-en.

History
The land became private property during the Meiji period. In 1919 the residence and gardens were laid out. The gardens have been open to the public since the end of the Shōwa period. In 2011 the garden residence was designated a Prefectural Cultural Property.

Gardens
The gardens consist of a pond garden, moss garden with tea house, and camellia garden.

Residence
Twelve component structures of the Taishō-period  have been jointly designated a Prefectural Cultural Property, seven in the main residence (the north, central, and south buildings, north entrance corridor, south corridor, and two earthen storehouses), three in the detached residence, an arbour, and the front gate, along with supplementary designations of two  or inscriptions relating to the building, fencing, and twelve painted fusuma panels; the last, formerly part of the Crane Room and Spring Orchid Room, were removed in 2006 and are now in the Nara Prefectural Museum of Art.

See also
 List of parks and gardens of Nara Prefecture

References

Gardens in Nara Prefecture
Nara, Nara